Villagarzón is a town and municipality located in the Putumayo Department, Republic of Colombia.

Climate
Villagarzón has a very wet and overcast tropical rainforest climate (Köppen Af).

References

Municipalities of Putumayo Department